Athyma speciosa  is a Limenitidinae butterfly endemic to the Philippines. It is found in Palawan and Balabac.

References

Athyma
Butterflies described in 1889
Butterflies of Asia
Taxa named by Otto Staudinger